The Accumulated Campaign Service Medal and the Accumulated Campaign Service Medal 2011 are medals awarded by King Charles III to members of his Armed Forces to recognise long campaign service. The original Accumulated Campaign Service Medal, instituted in January 1994, was awarded to holders of the General Service Medal (1962) who had completed 36 months of accumulated campaign service. The replacement Accumulated Campaign Service Medal 2011 is now currently awarded to holders of various campaign service medals who have completed 720 days of campaign service.

Description 
The Royal Warrant for the Accumulated Campaign Service Medal specifies that  The medal ribbon is the purple and green ribbon of the General Service Medal (1962) with an added central gold stripe denoting excellence. The Accumulated Campaign Service Medal 2011 uses the same medal, but with a ribbon with two central gold stripes.
The Accumulated Campaign Service Medal is hallmarked on the rim to the right of the suspension fixing. The 2011 version of the medal is not hallmarked.

Criteria
The Accumulated Campaign Service Medal was originally awarded to holders of the General Service Medal (1962) who had completed accumulated campaign service of 36 months since 14 August 1969. A clasp was awarded for each further period of 36 months campaign service. When the ribbon only is worn, a silver rosette is worn on the ribbon for each clasp, with a single gold rosette indicating four clasps. Criteria for part-time members of the Royal Irish Regiment were similar but with 1,000 days replacing 36 months.

The Accumulated Campaign Service Medal is currently awarded to those who have completed 1,080 days, aggregated by 1 January 2008, in theatres which would have merited a General Service Medal 1962 (e.g. for operations in Northern Ireland or air operations in Iraq), an Operational Service Medal for Afghanistan, an Operational Service Medal for Sierra Leone or an Iraq Medal.

The criteria for the medal were substantially revised in 2011. The qualifying period was reduced from 1,080 to 720 days, the medal was retitled the 'Accumulated Campaign Service Medal 2011' and the ribbon was redesigned. Qualification for the Accumulated Campaign Service Medal 2011 was also restricted to only those serving from 1 January 2008.

In 2019, the MOD Medal Office paused awarding the ACSM 2011 after concerns were raised that the Ministry of Defence was incorrectly applying the ‘double medaling’ principle to restrict qualification. The MOD initiated a review of the qualifying criteria and the results were made public on 30 July 2021. The review restored the previous less restrictive criteria and also announced that serving and former Service personnel, previously deemed ineligible for the ACSM 2011, can re-apply.

As at 11 February 2015, the Ministry of Defence had issued 50,548 ACSM 1994 medals and clasps and 10,280 ACSM 2011 medals and clasps.

References

External links 
 Shire Books - British Campaign Medals 1914-2005

Long and Meritorious Service Medals of Britain and the Commonwealth